A number of ships have been named Cape Mohican, including:

Ship names